The Town of Caledon's Walk of Fame is located in the Trans Canada Trail Pavilion Park, in Caledon, Ontario, Canada. Inductees are current or past residents, who have made significant contributions locally, nationally and internationally.

Inductees
 1999: Norman Jewison, filmmaker
 2000: Elmer Iseler, choir director
 2001: Robertson Davies, author
 2002: Robert and Signe McMichael, gallery founders
 2003: Dr. Faye Lindsey, physician
 2004: Dr. Murray Fallis, the "Father of Canadian parasitology"
 2005: Farley Mowat, author
 2006: Russell Cooper, photographer and history advocate
 2007: Daphne Lingwood, leather artist
 2008: Alex Raeburn, prominent community member, including municipal politician
 2009: Conn Smythe, sports businessman
 2010: James B. Douglas; actor, preserver of local history
 2011: Tayler Parnaby, broadcaster, journalist
 2012: Christopher Dedrick, composer, musician
 2013: Marilyn Field, teacher, founder of DAREArts
 2014: Donald Lobb, author, speaker, researcher, conservationist, notable agricultural research
 2015: Beverly Holden, duet synchronized swimming, and Jake Holden, judo and snowboard cross
 2016: Ken Weber
 2017: Isabel Bassett, journalist and politician
 2018: Cory Trépanier, filmmaker
 2019: Johnny Wayne, comedian
 2021: Frontline Workers of Caledon

References

External links
 

Caledon
Caledon
Caledon, Ontario
Ontario awards